Boronia heterophylla, commonly known as red boronia or Kalgan boronia, is a plant in the citrus family Rutaceae, and is endemic to the south-west of Western Australia. It is an erect, slender shrub with trifoliate leaves and deep pink to red, four-petalled flowers arranged singly in leaf axils.

Description
The leaves are only rarely simple. The eight stamens alternate in length. Flowering from September to November.

Taxonomy and naming
Boronia heterophylla was first formally described in 1860 by Ferdinand von Mueller and the description was published in Fragmenta phytographiae Australiae.<ref name="F.Muell.">{{cite book |last1=von Mueller |first1=Ferdinand |title=Fragmenta phytographiae Australiae |date=1860 |publisher=Victorian Government Printer |location=Melbourne |page=98 |url=https://www.biodiversitylibrary.org/item/7219#page/102/mode/1up |accessdate=7 February 2019}}</ref> The specific epithet (heterophylla) is derived from the ancient Greek words  meaning "different" and  meaning "leaf", referring to the variable leaves.

Distribution and habitat
The red boronia is usually found growing near streams between Busselton and Albany in the Esperance Plains, Jarrah Forest, Swan Coastal Plain and Warren biogeographic regions of Western Australia.

ConservationBoronia heterophylla'' is listed as "not threatened" by the Government of Western Australia Department of Parks and Wildlife.

References 

heterophylla
Flora of Western Australia
Plants described in 1860
Taxa named by Ferdinand von Mueller